Diphasiastrum is a genus of clubmosses in the plant family Lycopodiaceae. In the Pteridophyte Phylogeny Group classification of 2016 (PPG I), it is placed in the subfamily Lycopodioideae. It is closely related to the genus Lycopodium, and some botanists treat it within a broad view of that genus as a section, Lycopodium sect. Complanata.  Some species superficially resemble diminutive gymnosperms and have been given common names such as ground-pine or ground-cedar.

There are 16 species, and numerous natural hybrids in the genus; many of the hybrids are fertile, allowing their occurrence to become frequent, sometimes more so than the parent species. The basal chromosome count for this genus is n=23, which is distinctively different from other lycopods.

Several species have been used economically for their spores, which are harvested as Lycopodium powder.

Species 
, the Checklist of Ferns and Lycophytes of the World recognized the following species:

Diphasiastrum alpinum (L.) Holub – alpine clubmoss; circumpolar, subarctic and alpine
Diphasiastrum angustiramosum (Alderw.) Holub – New Guinea
Diphasiastrum carolinum (Lawalrée) Holub
Diphasiastrum complanatum (L.) Holub – flat-stemmed clubmoss, northern running-pine, or ground cedar; circumpolar, cool temperate
Diphasiastrum digitatum (Dill. ex A.Br.) Holub – fan clubmoss, southern running-pine, or running cedar; eastern Canada, northeastern United States, Appalachian Mountains
Diphasiastrum falcatum B.Øllg. & P.G.Windisch
Diphasiastrum fawcettii (F.E.Lloyd & Underw.) Holub – Jamaica, Hispaniola
Diphasiastrum henryanum (E.D.Br. & F.Br.) Holub – Marquesas Islands
Diphasiastrum madeirense (J.H.Wilce) Holub – Madeira, Azores
Diphasiastrum multispicatum (J.H.Wilce) Holub – Taiwan, Philippines
Diphasiastrum nikoense (Franch. & Sav.) Holub – Japan
Diphasiastrum platyrhizoma (J.H.Wilce) Holub – Borneo, Sumatra
Diphasiastrum sitchense (Rupr.) Holub – Alaskan clubmoss; northern North America
Diphasiastrum thyoides (Humb. & Bonpl. ex Willd.) Holub – Caribbean, Central and South America
Diphasiastrum tristachyum (Pursh) Holub – blue clubmoss, blue ground-cedar; circumpolar, cool temperate
Diphasiastrum veitchii (Christ) Holub – Veitch's clubmoss; eastern Himalayas east to Taiwan
Diphasiastrum wightianum (Wall. ex Hook. & Grev.) Holub – southeast Asia, New Guinea
Diphasiastrum yueshanense (C.M.Kuo) Holub – Taiwan
Diphasiastrum zanclophyllum (J.H.Wilce) Holub

Selected hybrids 
Some species are treated as hybrids, although not by all sources:
 Diphasiastrum × habereri (House) Holub (D. digitatum × D. tristachyum)
 Diphasiastrum × issleri (Rouy) Holub (syn. D. issleri, D. alpinum × D. complanatum)
 Diphasiastrum × oellgaardii Stoor, Boudrie, Jérôme, K.Horn & Bennert (D. alpinum × D. tristachyum)
 Diphasiastrum × sabinifolium  (Willd.) Holub (syn. D. sabinifolium, D. sitchense × D. tristachyum)
 Diphasiastrum × takedae Ivanenko (D. alpinum × D. sitchense)
 Diphasiastrum × verecundum A.V.Gilman (D. complanatum × D. digitatum)
 Diphasiastrum × zeilleri (Rouy) Holub (D. complanatum × D. tristachyum)

Distribution 
The genus has a subcosmopolitan distribution, in much of the Northern Hemisphere, south in mountains to South America (reaching furthest south in Jujuy Province, northwest Argentina), New Guinea and the Marquesas Islands in the Pacific Ocean, but confined to climates with high humidity for most or all of the year (or, in cool climates, protected by snow cover in winter).

References

External links 
 Holub, J. 1975. Diphasiastrum, a new genus in Lycopodiaceae. Preslia 14: 97-100.
 Flora of North America - Diphasiastrum 
 Photo of D. complanatum
 Picture and information  
  Pictures

 
Lycophyte genera